The Carleton Wind Farm is a 109.5MW wind farm comprising 73 1.5MW wind turbines spread over 5,000 hectares. It began commercial operations in November 2008. It is located near Carleton-sur-Mer, Quebec and it is owned and operated by Cartier Wind Energy.

See also

List of wind farms in Canada

References

Wind farms in Quebec